Wyness is a Scottish surname, a patronymic form of the surname Winn. Notable people with the surname include:

Dennis Wyness (born 1977), Scottish footballer
Keith Wyness (born 1958), Scottish businessman and football executive

References

English-language surnames
Patronymic surnames